is a 2007 film by Japanese nationalist filmmaker Satoru Mizushima about the 1937 Nanjing Massacre (Nanking Massacre).

Background and funding

Mizushima said he received more than 200 million yen (US$1.8 million) in donations from 5,000 of his supporters in order to fund the film. The film was backed by nationalistic figures including Tokyo governor Shintaro Ishihara and was intended to expose what the filmmakers saw as propaganda aspects of the Nanjing Massacre. Less than a month before the 70th anniversary of the Nanjing massacre, the director said in an interview that Japanese war criminals were martyrs who were made into scapegoats for war crimes as Jesus Christ was nailed to the cross in order to bear the sins of the world, and they died bearing all of old Japan's good and bad parts. Contrary to the scholarly consensus, he also claimed that the Nanjing Massacre was a politically motivated frame-up by China and the numerous Western eyewitnesses whose accounts form the basis of the historical understanding of the Nanjing Massacre. These accounts were, according to the filmmakers, espionage activities.

The film was based on the work of Asia University professor Shūdō Higashinakano who has claimed the massacre was a hoax. Hagashinakano was ordered by a Japanese court to pay compensation to a Chinese woman after he accused her of lying about being a victim of violence by the Japanese in Nanjing.

Mizushima said that the project was meant to counter the film Nanking, a 2007 American documentary, which he believed was "based on fabrications and gives a false impression" and which he perceives to be a "setup by China to control intelligence".

Plot
The Truth about Nanjing is a three-part film.
 The first section was "Seven condemned criminals" (The theme is Class A war criminals.)
This part shows the last day of the seven people who were condemned to death in 1948 by the International Military Tribunal for the Far East and executed on 23 December 1948 at Sugamo Prison, Tokyo. The film focuses on Iwane Matsui's campaign in Nanjing through flashbacks. Focus is put on each of the seven men. 
 The second section was for verification. (Documentary)
 The third section was for America. (Drama)

Cast
The cast of the first part
 Kenkichi Hamahata – Iwane Matsui
 Jun Fujimaki – Hideki Tōjō
 Minori Terada – Kōki Hirota
 Shōhei Yamada – Seishirō Itagaki
 Kuniyasu Atsumi – Kenji Doihara
 Baiken Jukkanji – Akira Mutō
 Akira Kubo – Heitarō Kimura
 Kan Mikami – Shinshō Hanayama, Chaplain of Sugamo Prison
 Kyōko Kamimura – Fumiko Matsui, wife of Iwane Matsui
 Setsuko Karasuma – Shizuko Hirota, wife of Kōki Hirota

Reactions

Tokushi Kasahara, professor at Tsuru University, said other countries were making faithful documentaries and "it is shameful that Japan can only make this kind of film."

Support in Japan
Journalist Yoshiko Sakurai and a number of serving national-level Japanese politicians came out in support of the film.
 House of Representatives:
 Shingo Nishimura (Independent) 
 Jin Matsubara (Democratic Party of Japan) 
 Tōru Toida (Liberal Democratic Party)
 Atsushi Watanabe (Liberal Democratic Party) 
 Masaaki Akaike (Liberal Democratic Party) 
 Eiichiro Washio (Democratic Party of Japan)  
 Hirofumi Ryu (Democratic Party of Japan) 
 Yohei Matsumoto (Democratic Party of Japan) 
 Tomomi Inada (Liberal Democratic Party) 
 House of Councillors:
 Shimpei Matsushita (independent) 
 Yasuhiro Oe (Liberal Democratic Party) 
 Nariaki Nakayama (Liberal Democratic Party)

See also

 Nanjing Massacre
 Nanjing Massacre denial
 Japanese war crimes
 The Rape of Nanking
 Japanese nationalism
 Japanese militarism
 Japanese right-wing

References

External links
 'Nankin No Shinjitsu' official website
'Nankin No Shinjitsu' official website in English
'The Truth of NANKING' official website in English and Japanese
"Film director brands Nanjing massacre a myth." Stuff.co.nz. Last updated January 1, 2009.

Japanese war films
Nanjing Massacre films
Documentary films about Japanese war crimes
2007 films
Historical negationism
2000s Japanese films